Garissa Power Station is a  solar power plant in Kenya.

Location

Overview
It is expected to create about 1,000 jobs during the construction period. The power from this power station is enough to power about 625,000 homes.

The power station is owned and operated by Kenya Rural Electrification Authority, a government agency. The power generated will be sold to Kenya Power and Lighting for integration into the national grid. In February 2018, the Business Daily Africa, reported that the expected commissioning of this power plant had been pushed back to December 2018, following delays. The solar park sells electricity wholesale to Kenya Power at Sh5.49 per unit. The power purchase agreement, signed in September 2016, calls for Kenya Power to sell electricity from the solar plant at KSh12 (US$0.12) per kilowatt hour, approximately KSh8 cheaper than diesel-generated electricity.

Construction timeline, costs, and funding
China Jiangxi, a Chinese construction company was awarded the construction contract at a budgeted cost of KSh13.7 billion ($135.7 million), borrowed from Exim Bank of China. Construction was expected to begin in the fourth quarter of 2016 and was expected to last one year. Due to prolonged negotiations in securing a power purchase agreement from Kenya Power and Lighting, construction of this project was delayed. As of February 2018, commissioning of the power station was expected in December 2018. In August 2018, The EastAfrican reported that the new commissioning date had been brought forward to September 2018. The solar power plant was officially launched by President Uhuru Kenyatta on December 13th 2019.

See also

List of power stations in Kenya

References

External links
 Website of Kenya Rural Electrification Authority
  Kenya unveils plans to construct largest solar power plant in East Africa

Solar power stations in Kenya
Garissa County
Energy infrastructure completed in 2018
2018 establishments in Kenya